Bitton Association Football Club is a football club based in the South Gloucestershire suburb of Bitton, in England. Affiliated to the Gloucestershire County Football Association, they play at the Recreation Ground on Bath Road.

History
The club was established in 1892. They were members of the Bristol & Suburban League, before joining the Bristol & District League in the late 1920s. The club were relegated to Division Four in the early 1950s, but a fourth-place finish in 1954–55 saw them promoted to Division Three, and they went on to win Division Three the following season. The club switched to the Bristol Premier Combination in the late 1950s, but returned to the Bristol & District League in 1960. They then joined the Bristol Church of England League, before returning to the Bristol Premier Combination, now renamed the Avon Premier Combination, during the 1970s. Bitton were promoted to the Premier Division in 1990–91, and in 1994–95 they won the Gloucestershire Senior Amateur Cup and were runners-up in the Premier Division, earning promotion to the Gloucestershire County League.

In 1996–97 Bitton were runners-up in the Gloucestershire County League and were promoted to Division One of the Western League. The 2003–04 season saw the club finish second in Division One, resulting in promotion to the Premier Division. They went on to win the league's Les Phillips Cup and the Gloucestershire Challenge Trophy in 2007–08.  The club retain the Challenge Trophy as well as winning the Premier Division title the following season; however, they were unable to take promotion to the Southern League as their ground did not meet the requirements. They went on to finish as runners-up in 2010–11 and 2011–12.

The 2019–20 season saw Bitton reach the semi-finals of the FA Vase, eventually losing 1–0 after extra time to Consett. In October 2022 the club withdrew from the Western League, citing travelling costs as the main reason for the decision.

Ground
The club has played at the Recreation Ground since their establishment. A seated stand and cover for 150 was installed after joining the Western League, with floodlights erected in 2001. The ground currently has a capacity of 2,000, of which 100 is seated.

Bitton Ladies
Bitton Ladies were established in 2007 and joined the Gloucestershire County Women's League. They won the league title and League Cup in 2012–13, and were promoted to the Eastern Division of the South West Regional Women's League. However, they folded at the end of the following season.

Honours
Western League
Premier Division champions 2008–09
Les Phillips Cup winners 2007–08
Bristol & District League
Division Three champions 1955–56 
Gloucestershire Challenge Trophy
Winners 2007–08, 2008–09
Gloucestershire Senior Amateur Cup (South)
Winners 1994–95

Records
Best FA Cup performance: Second qualifying round, 2005–06, 2008–09
Best FA Vase performance: Semi-finals, 2019–20
Most goals: A. Cole

See also
Bitton A.F.C. players

References

External links
Official website

Football clubs in England
Football clubs in Gloucestershire
1892 establishments in England
Association football clubs established in 1892
Bristol and Suburban Association Football League
Bristol and District Football League
Bristol and Avon Association Football League
Bristol Premier Combination
Gloucestershire County Football League
Western Football League